Western Alliance Bancorporation is a regional bank holding company headquartered in Phoenix, Arizona. It is on the list of largest banks in the United States and is ranked 13th on the Forbes list of America's Best Banks.  

The company's banking subsidiaries include Alliance Association Bank, a commercial bank specializing in homeowner associations in Arizona; Alliance Bank of Arizona, a retail bank; Bank of Nevada, a retail bank in Clark County, Nevada; Bridge Bank, a commercial bank in the San Francisco Bay Area with loan production offices in nine states; First Independent Bank, a retail bank in western Nevada, and Torrey Pines Bank, a retail bank in Southern California. Western Alliance also owns AmeriHome Mortgage, a mortgage loan company.

History
The bank was founded in 1994 in Las Vegas, Nevada. 

In 2010, it moved its headquarters to Phoenix, Arizona.

In April 2021, the company acquired AmeriHome for $1.22 billion.

March 2023 United States Bank Failures
During the March 2023 United States bank failures, Western Alliance Bancorporation share price fell 82% before trading was halted.

References

External links
 

1994 establishments in Nevada
American companies established in 1994
Banks based in Arizona
Banks established in 1994
Companies based in Phoenix, Arizona
Companies listed on the New York Stock Exchange